Belušić (Serbian Cyrillic: Белушић) is a village in Šumadija and Western Serbia, in the municipality of Rekovac (Region of Levač). The village has around 934 residents.

External links 
 Levač Online
 Article about Belušić

Populated places in Pomoravlje District
Šumadija